Brasiella wickhami, the sonoran tiger beetle, is a species of flashy tiger beetle in the family Carabidae. It is found in Central America and North America.

References

Further reading

 
 
 
 
 

Cicindelidae
Beetles described in 1903